Portals to Uphobia is the second full-length studio album Detonation released on the French label Osmose Productions.

The artwork for the album was created by Niklas Sundin of Dark Tranquillity.

Track listing

 "Into Sulphur I Descend" − 5:13
 "Portals to Uphobia" − 3:07
 "Structural Deceit" − 4:44
 "Chaos Banished" − 3:59
 "End of Sight, End of Fears" − 4:40
 "Lost Euphoria Part III (instrumental)" − 3:51
 "The Loss of Motion Control" − 4:31
 "Solitude Reflected" − 5:01
 "Beyond the Margin" − 4:01
 "The Source to Delve" − 4:44

Credits

Band members
 Koen Romeijn − Vocals, Guitar
 Mike Ferguson − Guitar
 Thomas Kalksma − Drums
 Otto Schimmelpenninck − Bass guitar

Guest appearances
 Michiel Bikker − first guitar solo on track 5

Other
 Niklas Sundin − Cover Artwork

Detonation (band) albums
2005 albums